Swiss Management Center (previously SMC University) is a private business school founded in 1985. It is based in Zug, Switzerland and has offices in Vienna and Buenos Aires.

Accreditation 

In Switzerland, Swiss Management Center awards its own private degrees.

In Ghana, Swiss Management Center was registered in as a foreign university and was accredited by The National Accreditation Board (Ghana) - NAB. In August 2016, this accreditation status was removed.

Faculty, students and alumni 
SMC has an international focus and claims to have educated students from more than 130 countries.

Some of the notable Alumni of SMC University include:
Goski Alabi, President of Laweh Open University.
Bernice Adiku Heloo, former Member of Parliament for Hohoe Constituency in Ghana.

References

Business schools in Switzerland
Companies based in Zürich
Unaccredited institutions of higher learning